The Nutty Professor may refer to:

 The Nutty Professor (1963 film), directed by and starring Jerry Lewis
 The Nutty Professor (1996 film), directed by Tom Shadyac and starring Eddie Murphy
 The Nutty Professor (soundtrack), soundtrack album for the 1996 film
 Nutty Professor II: The Klumps, 2000 sequel to the 1996 film
 Nutty Professor II: The Klumps (soundtrack), soundtrack album for the 2000 film
 The Nutty Professor (2008 film), animated sequel to the 1963 film
 The Nutty Professor (character), the titular character in the above media